Shuangjiang Township is a rural township in Louxing District of Loudi City, Hunan Province, People's Republic of China.

Administrative division
The township is divided into 19 villages, the following areas: 
 Nongxin Village
 Tanxi Village
 Shuangjiang Village
 Chayang Village
 Zhujia Village
 Hongshan Village
 Xinzhuang Village
 Xinlian Village
 Xinjia Village
 Wanjia Village
 Fangshi Village
 Qingqiao Village
 Yiping Village
 Pingdi Village
 Hengshi Village
 Xiaotian Village
 Qishi Village
 Jialun Village
 Tianhu Village

Geography
The township shares a border with Qixingjie Town of Lianyuan to the west, Hutian Town to the southeast, Qingshanqiao Town to the northeast, Qiaotouhe Town to the southwest, Longtian Town to the north, and Shanshan Town to the south.

Transportation
Changsha-Shaoshan-Loudi Expressway passes across the township east to west.

References

External links

Divisions of Louxing District